Anjiajia is a town and commune in Madagascar. It belongs to the district of Ambato-Boeni, which is a part of Boeny Region. The population of the commune was estimated to be approximately 13,000 in the 2001 commune census.

Primary and junior-level secondary education are available in town. The majority 85% of the population of the commune are farmers, while an additional 8% receive their livelihood from raising livestock. The most important crops are rice and cotton, while other important agricultural products are peanuts and beans.  Services provide employment for 2% of the population. Additionally, fishing employs 5% of the population.

Energy
In 2010 the first unit of production of electricity by biomass in Madagascar had been inaugurated in Anjiajia. It is driven with a rice hull and has a capacity of 40 kW x 2.
Since 2021 also a micro-hydroelectric power plant with a capacity of 80 kW had been installed.

References and notes 

Populated places in Boeny